Streptocarpus teitensis, synonym Saintpaulia teitensis, is a species of Streptocarpus in the section Saintpaulia. It is endemic to 1 square kilometer on Mbololo Hill in the Taita Hills of southern Kenya. The total population is estimated at less than 2,500 individual plants in the wild.

References

 Notes Roy. Bot. Gard. Edinburgh 22: 559 1958.

teitensis
Endemic flora of Kenya